Hochstett is a commune in the Bas-Rhin department in Grand Est in north-eastern France.

Geography
Hochstett is positioned near to the autoroute that connects Strasbourg with Metz and, eventually, Paris. It is adjacent to the autoroute exit 47 which is the exit for Haguenau, although the limited access nature of the autoroute junctions in the area makes access from the autoroute to the village unexpectedly indirect.

The village is at the crossing of various minor roads, the least minor being the departmental road RD 419.

A principal element in the local economy is agriculture.

See also
 Communes of the Bas-Rhin department

References

Communes of Bas-Rhin
Bas-Rhin communes articles needing translation from French Wikipedia